Kannada Nadu Party is a political party in Karnataka, India, founded by Vijay Sankashwar. It has merged into Janata Dal (Secular). It contested elections in 2004.

References

Political parties in Karnataka
Political parties with year of establishment missing
Janata Dal (Secular) politicians